Tomás Mac Síomóin  (19 February 1938 – 17 February 2022) was an Irish doctoral graduate of Cornell University, New York, who worked as a biological researcher and university lecturer in the US and Ireland. He worked as a journalist, as editor of the newspaper Anois and for many years was editor of the literary and current affairs magazine, Comhar. He wrote in Irish and published both poetry and fiction in that language.

Biography
He was born in Dublin. His story Cinn Lae Seangáin (“The Diary of an Ant”) won the award for best short story collection in the Oireachtas 2005 competition, while in the following year his novel An Tionscadal (“The Project”) won the main Oireachtas literary award.

His poems, stories, articles and translations from Catalan and Spanish have appeared in diverse publications. His novel, Ceallaigh (2009), was written in Cuba; it challenges some common assumptions about contemporary Cuban life and history.

His work has been translated into many languages, most recently into Slovenian, Romanian and Catalan. He lived and worked since circa 1998 in Catalonia.

Tomás Mac Síomóin died on 17 February 2022, at the age of 83.

Published works

Short stories
Diary of an Ant (Nuascéalta, 2013) English translation of Cín Lae Seangáin agus Scéalta Eile.
Cín Lae Seangáin agus Scéalta Eile (Coiscéim, 2005)
Einsamkeit in Erkundungen-30 irische Erzähler (Verlag Volk und Welt. Berlin, 1979)

Poetry
File ar Fhile: Dánta Antonio Machado (Cois Life, 2019)
21 dán/poemes/poemas (Coiscéim, 2010), collected poems in Irish, Catalan and Spanish
Scian (Sáirséal Ó Marcaigh, 1991)
Cré agus Cláirseach (Sáirséal Ó Marcaigh, 1983)
Codarsnaí (Clódhanna Teo., 1981)
Damhna agus Dánta eile (Sáirséal & Dill, 1974)

Novels
Is Stacey Pregnant?: Notes from the Irish Dystopia (Nuascéalta, 2014), an English translation of An bhfuil Stacey ag iompar?
The Cartographer's Apprentice: A 21st Century Fable (Nuascéalta, 2013), an English translation of An Tionscadal
An bhfuil Stacey ag iompar? (Coiscéim, 2011)
Ceallaigh (Coiscéim, 2009) 
An Tionscadal (Coiscéim, 2007)
In inmhe (Coiscéim, 2004)
Ag altóir an diabhail: striptease spioradálta Bheartla B (Coiscéim, 2003)

Non-fiction

The Gael becomes Irish: An Unfinished Odyssey (Nuascéalta, 2020)
Fuego Verde: Sangre Celta en las Venas de América Latina (Nuascéalta, 2018)
Raghallach na Fola/O'Reilly Hasta La Muerte (Coiscéim, 2015)
The Broken Harp:Identity and Language in Modern Ireland (Nuascéalta, 2014)
Mharaíodar/Asesinaron Camila (Coiscéim, 2012)
Nasc na Fola (An Gúm, 2011)
Na/Los Patricios (Coiscéim, 2011)

Anthologies
Three Leaves of a Bitter Shamrock (Nuascéalta, 2014)
Best European Fiction 2013 (Dalkey Archive Press, 2012), Aleksandar Hemon (series editor), John Banville (preface)
The Willow's Whisper: A Transatlantic Compilation of Poetry from Ireland and Native America (Cambridge Scholars Publishing, 2011), Jill M. O Mahony and Mícheál Ó hAodha, editors
Irish Writing in the Twentieth Century: a Reader (Cork University Press, 2000), David Pierce, editor
Das zweimaleins des Steins-Poesie aus Irland. (Die horen, Bremerhaven, 1998)
Poetry Ireland Review 39: Autumn 1993: Special Issue: Contemporary Poetry in Irish (Colour Books, 1993), Seán Ó Cearnaigh, editor
Irish Poetry Now: Other Voices (Merlin Publishing, 1993), Gabriel Fitzmaurice, editor
Dánta in An Crann Faoi Bhláth/The Flowering Tree (Eag: Declan Kiberd agus Gabriel Fitzmaurice, Wolfhound, B.Á.C. 1991)

Translations
Pedro Páramo (Coiscéim, 2008), aistriúchán ón Spáinnis ar úrscéal Meicsiceánach de chuid Juan Rulfo.
Na cathracha caillte (Coiscéim, 2004), aistriúcháin ar dánta Spáinnise Ernesto Cardenal.
Selected poems /Tacar dánta (Goldsmith Press, 1984), bilingual selection of poems by Máirtín Ó Díreáin in collaboration with Douglas Sealy.
Mo Chroí san Afraic (An Gúm, 2002), translation of El meu cor es diu Africa, a Catalan novel for teenagers by Victor Mora, in collaboration with Carl Mac Gabhann.

Essays
"Cultura literària en llengua irlandesa: Cruïlla o final de viatge" (Revista CIDOB d'Afers Internacionals, 2010)
Faoin Bhratach Dhearg (2007)
Macallaí na Cásca 1 1916: Leath-réabhlóid. Paradacsa ait na Gaeilge (Coiscéim, 2006)
Ó Mhársa go Magla: straitéis nua don Ghaeilge (Coiscéim, 2006). 
Ceachtanna ón gCatalóin: teanga i ngleic le nualiobrálachas (Coiscéim, 2005)
Tuairisc ón bPluais: poblachtánachas agus litríocht in aois na scáth (Coiscéim, 2004). 
Poet of Conscience: The Old and the New in the Poetry of Sorley MacLean (Scottish Academic Press, 1986)

See also
Caoimhghin Ó Croidheáin

References

External links
Website
Coiscéim Publishers
Information about Mac Síomóin, by 'Cois Life' a publisher of literary and research works in Irish
Lessons from Catalonia ''^
 Tomás Mac Síomóin, un "patrici" irlandès a Sant Feliu. Revista de Girona 290/2015 (in Catalan)

1938 births
2022 deaths
Irish-language writers
20th-century Irish short story writers
20th-century Irish poets
20th-century Irish novelists
20th-century Irish non-fiction writers
20th-century Irish male writers
21st-century Irish short story writers
21st-century Irish poets
21st-century Irish novelists
21st-century Irish non-fiction writers
Irish male short story writers
Irish male poets
Irish male novelists
Irish male non-fiction writers
Irish essayists
Writers from Dublin (city)